Levels of the Game is a 1969 book by John McPhee, nominally about tennis and tennis players, but exploring deeper issues as well.

The book is structured around a description of the semi-final match in the 1968 U.S. Open Championship at Forest Hills, played between Clark Graebner and Arthur Ashe; Ashe won, and went on to win the Championship, becoming the only amateur to win it in the Open era. It alternates between sections which describe the match, and profiles of the two contestants, who had come to tennis from completely different environments. Both 25 at the time, they had known one another for half their lives. This was a concept that interested McPhee, who wanted to explore how such long interaction, and the dissimilar backgrounds of the two, shaped the encounter between them.

Robert Lipsyte of The New York Times, in his review of the book, wrote that it "may be the high point of American sports journalism".

External links
 Levels of the Game at John McPhee's web site
 Reviews

Tennis books
1969 non-fiction books
Books by John McPhee